Herbert Bradley (1888 – 21 June 1918) was an English professional footballer who played as a outside left in the Football League for Bury, Notts County and Preston North End.

Personal life 
Bradley served as a gunner in the Royal Garrison Artillery during the First World War. On 5 April 1918, while acting as a forward artillery observer, he was taken prisoner by German forces and taken to Limburg an der Lahn prisoner of war camp. He died of dysentery in the camp on 21 June 1918 and was buried in Avesnes-sur-Helpe Communal Cemetery, France.

References

English footballers
English Football League players
1888 births
1918 deaths
Military personnel from Lancashire
Burials in France
Association football outside forwards
People from Padiham
Colne F.C. players
Bury F.C. players
Notts County F.C. players
Padiham F.C. players
Preston North End F.C. players
Great Harwood F.C. players
Nelson F.C. players
British Army personnel of World War I
Royal Garrison Artillery soldiers
Deaths from dysentery
British World War I prisoners of war
World War I prisoners of war held by Germany
British military personnel killed in World War I
Infectious disease deaths in Germany